Long Eaton is a town and unparished area in the Borough of Erewash in Derbyshire, England. The town and the surrounding area contain 31 listed buildings that are recorded in the National Heritage List for England. Of these, two are listed at Grade II*, the middle of the three grades, and the others are at Grade II, the lowest grade.  The Erewash Canal and the Cranfleet Canal pass through the area, and the listed buildings associated with them are bridges, locks, and a lockkeeper's cottage.  The other listed buildings include houses and associated structures, churches and a Sunday school, a set of park gates, a college chapel, commercial buildings, cemetery buildings, a library, schools designed by G. H. Widdows, and a war memorial.


Key

Buildings

References

Citations

Sources

 

Lists of listed buildings in Derbyshire
Long Eaton